Bear Mountain is a  mountain located in Bartlett, New Hampshire, USA. Bear Mountain is flanked to the northwest, across Bear Notch, by Bartlett Haystack (2,995 ft / 1,027 m). To the east is Table Mountain (2,675 ft / 815 m), followed by Big Attitash Mountain (2,920 ft / 890 m). The north side of Bear Mountain drains via Louisville Brook and Albany Brook to the Saco River in Bartlett. The southern slopes of the mountain drain to the Swift River, on the southwest via Douglas Brook and on the southeast via Cilley Brook, which joins the Swift River at Rocky Gorge.

Once home to an alpine ski trail, Bear Mountain is sometimes confused with nearby Bear Peak at the Attitash ski area.

See also 

 List of mountains in New Hampshire
 White Mountain National Forest

References

External links 
 Bear Mountain - New England's Alpine CCC Ski Trails
 Bear - NHMountainHiking.com

Mountains of New Hampshire
Mountains of Carroll County, New Hampshire